Kazuramimba is an administrative ward in Uvinza District of Kigoma Region in Tanzania. 
In 2016 the Tanzania National Bureau of Statistics report there were 37,551 people in the ward, from 34,115 in 2012.

Hamlets 
The ward has 9 hamlets.
 Kidea
 Kilelema A
 Kilelema B
 Kilelema C
 Rubona A
 Rubona B
 Rubona C
 Tambukareli Magharibi
 Tambukareli Mashariki

References

Wards of Kigoma Region